India–Bangladesh border haat is a Haat or a trading post on Bangladesh–India border, jointly organised by the governments of Bangladesh and India, held one day each week. It is not only a market for locals and tourists  for buying daily commodities but also a reunion spot for families living on both sides of the international border.

The border haats aim at promoting the wellbeing of the people dwelling in remote areas across the borders of two countries by establishing a traditional system of marketing the local produce through local markets. Border Haats enhance the bilateral people-to-people international relations, rejuvenate local economy, create jobs, and provide diversity of quality goods at cheaper price specially in the remote border areas.

Functioning of Haats

Management 

Each border Haat is managed and organised by the Haat Management Committee of the respective border haat. It is jointly staffed by the India and the concerned nation which shares border with India.

Trade volume and currency 

The trade at border haats is permitted to be carried out either on a barter basis or in Indian Rupees and the currency of country with which border is shared, for example, Indian Rupee and Bangladesh Taka on India-Bangladesh border. Data of barter trade is maintained by the Haat Management Committee of the respective border haat.

List of Border Haats 
At present there are five border haats on the Indo-Bangladesh border.
 Radhanagar-Krishnanagar Border Haat
Tarapur - Kamalasagar Border Haat
Baliamari-Kalairchar Border Haat
Dolura-Balat Border Haat
Baganbari-Rinku Border Haat

See also 

 Borders and trade of India 
 Border ceremonies of India's with neighbours
 Borders of India
 Economy of India
 Foreign trade of India
 BIMSTEC
 SAARC

 Similar markets in Indian subcontinent 
 Bazaar
 Chaupal
 Dhaba
 Melā
 Tapri

References

Bangladesh–India relations
Bangladesh–India border